St. Michael's is an electoral ward in Coventry, West Midlands, England. The ward's population is 21,700 (2010). In 2001, its population was 56% White British and 23% Asian or Asian British, many of whom were Bangladeshi. The ward includes many students, and 20- to 24-year-olds make up over 20% of the population. The ward population had increased to 24,119 at the 2011 Census.

According to the city's 2007 Index of Deprivation, St. Michael's is the second most deprived ward of the city. While the average household income in Coventry was £31,697 in 2008, it was £25,372 in St. Michael's, making it the second poorest ward, though it grew by 24.5% since 2005, which is a more rapid pace of growth than that of the Coventry average (14.5%). Similarly, the crime rate in St. Michael's was slightly over three times as high as that of Coventry as a whole in 2007, but it had fallen by 34% since 2004/'05, when it was over four times as high. The unemployment rate in the ward was 4.6% in September 2008, when that of Coventry as a whole was 3.6%, but in 2001 unemployment in St. Michael's was still twice as high as in Coventry overall (6.2% vs. 3.0%). That change may however also be due to boundary changes in 2004.

Currently, the ward contains the city centre of Coventry, including St. Michael's Cathedral and the neighbourhoods of Charterhouse and Hillfields. Hillfields is undergoing large-scale changes, which encompass the demolition of Coventry City's Highfield Road stadium and what the Coventry City Council describes as "the biggest single regeneration project in Coventry".

St. Michael's Ward is represented by three Labour Councillors. They are Naeem Akhtar (term of office: 2016–2021), Jim O'Boyle (2019–2023) and David Welsh (2018–2022).

2022 Election

2021 Election

2019 Election

2018 Election

2016 Election

2015 election

2014 election

2012 election

References

External links
 Coventry council page on St Michael's

Wards of Coventry